Shigatse, officially known as Xigazê (Nepali: सिगात्से), is a prefecture-level city of the Tibet Autonomous Region of the People's Republic of China.

Overview
The administrative center of the prefecture-level city is the Samzhubzê District.

Some of the towns in the prefecture are: Gyantse (Gyantse County), Tingri (Tingri County), and Nyalam (Nyalam County).

On 11 July 2014 Shigatse Prefecture was upgraded into a prefecture-level city (the same status as Lhasa).

Transport

Rail 
The Lhasa–Xigazê Railway connects Xigazê Railway Station with Lhasa and further connects with Qinghai via Qinghai–Tibet Railway. It takes about three hours to travel between Lhasa and Shigatse by train.
It is possible to get back to Lhasa within the same day by train.

Air 
Shigatse Peace Airport began operations on 30 October 2010 after an Airbus A319 landed safely, making it Tibet's fifth commercial airport. It is located 43 kilometres from Samzhubzê District at Jangdam Township at an elevation of 3,782 metres. The airport will be capable of supporting 230,000 passengers annually by 2020.

Road 
China National Highway 318 and China National Highway 219 are the main roads in and out of Shigatse.

Counties

Climate
Shigatse has an elevation-influenced humid continental climate (Köppen climate classification: Dwb).

Gallery

See also 
 Shigatse Photovoltaic Power Plant

References

Further reading
 Shigatse Annals

External links 

 

 
Prefecture-level divisions of Tibet